Hemerorhinus opici is an eel in the family Ophichthidae (worm/snake eels). It was described by Jacques Blache and Marie-Louise Bauchot in 1972. It is a marine, tropical eel which is known from the eastern Atlantic Ocean, including Senegal and Angola. It inhabits shallow waters near to shore, and forms burrows in sand and mud substrates.

Etymology
The fish is named in honor of Pierre Opic, who was the one who provided the illustrations for Blache’s African anguilliform monographs.

References

Ophichthidae
Taxa named by Jacques Blache
Taxa named by Marie-Louise Bauchot
Fish described in 1972